About a Boy may refer to:
 About a Boy (novel), a 1998 novel by British writer Nick Hornby

Film and TV
About a Boy (film), a 2002 film starring Hugh Grant, directed by brothers Chris Weitz and Paul Weitz, based on the 1998 novel
 About a Boy (soundtrack), a 2002 album by Badly Drawn Boy released as the soundtrack to the 2002 film
 About a Boy (TV series), a 2014 situation comedy on NBC, based on the 1998 novel
 "About a Boy" (Homeland), an episode of the Showtime TV series Homeland

Other
 "About a Boy" (song), a 1996 song by Patti Smith, from the album Gone Again

See also
About a Girl (disambiguation)